Glyphodes jaculalis is a moth in the family Crambidae. It was described by Snellen in 1894. It is found on Java.

References

Moths described in 1894
Glyphodes